Leysen is a surname. Notable people with the surname include:

André Leysen (1927–2015), Belgian businessman
Christian Leysen (born 1954), Belgian businessman
Johan Leysen (born 1950), Belgian actor
Senne Leysen (born 1996), Belgian cyclist
Thomas Leysen (born 1960), Belgian entrepreneur